Maria Tatsi (original name: Μαρία Τάτση, born  in Ioannina) is a Greek female weightlifter, competing in the 69 kg category and representing Greece at international competitions. 

She participated at the 2000 Summer Olympics in the 69 kg event. She competed at world championships, most recently at the 2001 World Weightlifting Championships.

Major results

References

External links
 
http://www.the-sports.org/maria-tatsi-weightlifting-spf394489.html
http://www.todor66.com/weightlifting/World/1998/Women_under_69kg.html
http://www.todor66.com/weightlifting/World/2001/Women_under_69kg.html
http://www.alamy.com/stock-photo-greeces-maria-tatsi-fails-to-lift-1325kg-in-the-womens-69kg-weightlifting-118645818.html
https://www.youtube.com/watch?v=_SPBUDgz3L0

1971 births
Living people
Greek female weightlifters
Weightlifters at the 2000 Summer Olympics
Olympic weightlifters of Greece
Mediterranean Games gold medalists for Greece
Mediterranean Games silver medalists for Greece
Mediterranean Games medalists in weightlifting
Competitors at the 2001 Mediterranean Games
Sportspeople from Ioannina
21st-century Greek women